Patrícia Marková Rogulski (born 5 January 1973) is a Slovak former professional tennis player.

Biography
Marková, who comes from Trnava, competed on the professional tour in the 1990s. She combined her tennis career with university study and regularly represented Slovakia at the Summer Universiade, winning four bronze medals.

On the professional tour, she reached a best singles ranking of 329 in the world and featured in the main draw of the 1995 TVA Cup in Nagoya. As a doubles player she won 14 ITF titles, with a best world ranking of 121.

After retiring in 1998, Marková played club tennis in Austria for several years and married local coach Bogdan Rogulski, formerly of Poland. The couple run a tennis club in Madunice, Slovakia.

ITF finals

Singles (1–0)

Doubles (14–9)

References

External links
 
 

1973 births
Living people
Slovak female tennis players
Universiade medalists in tennis
Universiade bronze medalists for Slovakia
Sportspeople from Trnava
Medalists at the 1997 Summer Universiade
Medalists at the 1999 Summer Universiade
20th-century Slovak women